Oliver Harder (born 31 January 1986) is a New Zealand association football coach and former player who is the current manager of Norwegian team SK Brann Kvinner. He has previously coached in the United States, China and Norway, was head coach of Norwegian women's club Klepp IL from 2017 until 2019, and head coach of West Ham United Women from 2020 until 2022.

Playing career
Harder played association football for two clubs in the New Zealand Football Championship as a goalkeeper.

Managerial career
Harder has coached in the United States, China, Norway and England. In the United States, he coached Wilton Blue Under-11s in the Connecticut Junior Soccer Association league system. He was a volunteer assistant coach in the American collegiate soccer system for the NJIT Highlanders and the Yale Bulldogs. He worked for Club Football China.

In 2017, Harder became head coach of Klepp IL women's football team. In the three seasons he was in charge, they finished fourth, second and third respectively. Klepp's 2017 finish was the first time in 20 years that they had finished in the top four in the league. He was nominated for the Norwegian Coach of the Year award in 2017 and 2018. In 2018, Harder achieved his UEFA A Licence. Harder left Klepp at the end of the 2019 season.

In December 2019, Harder became assistant manager of the Sandnes Ulf men's team. In the 2020 season, Sandnes Ulf finished seventh in the 1. divisjon, and he left the role at the end of the 2020 season. He had also been an assistant manager of the Norway men's under-23 team.

In December 2020, Harder was appointed head coach of West Ham United Women, on a two-and-a-half year contract. He replaced Matt Beard as head coach. Harder's first scheduled match in charge of West Ham against Manchester City was postponed due to COVID-19 positive tests in the Manchester City squad. He led West Ham to sixth place in the 2021–22 FA WSL, with their highest ever points total in a season. He resigned on 8 May 2022.

Harder returned to Norway in May 2022, being named as the new director of sports of SK Brann Kvinner. When Brann manager Alexander Straus left for Bayern Munich women, Harder took over as manager in July 2022.

Personal life
Harder was born in New Zealand to German parents. He has a degree in sports science from Unitec Institute of Technology and studied for one semester at Virginia Tech.

References

External links

1986 births
Living people
New Zealand people of German descent
West Ham United F.C.
New Zealand association footballers
Association football goalkeepers
New Zealand association football coaches
Unitec Institute of Technology alumni
New Zealand expatriate association football managers
New Zealand expatriate sportspeople in Norway
Expatriate football managers in Norway
New Zealand expatriate sportspeople in England
Expatriate football managers in England
Women's Super League managers
NJIT Highlanders men's soccer coaches
Association football coaches
New Zealand expatriate sportspeople in the United States
New Zealand expatriate sportspeople in China